Rainbow is an unincorporated community in Washington County, in the U.S. state of Ohio.

History
The first settlement at Rainbow was made in the spring of 1795. The community most likely took its name from Rainbow Creek. A post office called Rainbow was established in 1888, and remained in operation until 1903.

References

Unincorporated communities in Washington County, Ohio
Unincorporated communities in Ohio
Populated places established in 1795
1795 establishments in the Northwest Territory